The 2019 South Florida Bulls men's soccer team represented the University of South Florida during the 2019 NCAA Division I men's soccer season and the 2019 American Athletic Conference men's soccer season. The regular season began on August 30 and concluded on November 5. It was the program's 55th season fielding a men's varsity soccer team, and their 7th season in the AAC. The 2019 season was Bob Butehorn's third year as head coach for the program.

Roster

Schedule 

|-
!colspan=6 style=""| Preseason
|-

|-
!colspan=6 style=""| Regular season
|-

|-
!colspan=6 style=""| American Athletic Tournament
|-

|-
!colspan=6 style=""| NCAA Tournament
|-

|}

Notes

References 

2019
South Florida Bulls
South Florida Bulls
South Florida Bulls men's soccer
South Florida Bulls